The 28 cm MRK L/40 was a German naval gun that was used in World War I as the primary armament of the  pre-dreadnought battleships.  Some were also converted to railway guns during World War I.

Design 
The 28 cm MRK L/40 gun was a built-up gun made from three layers of reinforcing hoops.  It used a cylindro-prismatic horizontal sliding breech, but unlike later Krupp guns it did not use a metallic cartridge case.  Instead, it used separate loading bagged charges and projectiles.

The four ships of the Brandenburg class had a slightly unusual arrangement for their primary armament. Although the primary armament consisted of six 28 cm guns in three twin gun turrets that all fired the same ammunition, the fore and aft turrets had 28 cm MRK L/40 guns, while the amidships turret had 28 cm MRK L/35 guns due to space constraints. The ships did not have centralized fire control and each gun type had different ballistics.

Railway artillery 
These were installed on Eisenbahn und Bettungsschiessgerüst (E. u. B.) (railroad and firing platform) mounts successfully used by other German railroad guns. Unlike every other large German railroad gun, it used a massive rectangular cradle for its gun.

The six "Kurfürst" guns entered service in early 1918, participating in the German spring offensive and the subsequent defensive operations. They were organized into Batteries 393, 434, 722 and the First through Third Batteries of Bavarian Foot Artillery Battalion (1.-3./Bayerische Fußartillerie-Batallion) 29 with one gun each. All six were destroyed in 1921–22 by the Military Inter-Allied Commission of Control.

Coastal artillery 
The 28 cm L/40 was also used by Chile who operated four guns at Fuerte Vergara, Valdivia and Yerbas Buenas until 1956.  China also bought two 28 cm L/40 guns to arm Fort Hulishan, Xiamen, China.

Ammunition 

Photo gallery

References

Bibliography 
 François, Guy. Eisenbahnartillerie: Histoire de l'artillerie lourd sur voie ferrée allemande des origines à 1945. Paris: Editions Histoire et Fortifications, 2006 
pgonzalezp.pdf

280 mm artillery
Naval guns of Germany
World War I naval weapons
World War I artillery of Germany
Coastal artillery